The Democratic and Social Party of Ceuta (Spanish: Partido Democrático y Social de Ceuta, PDSC) is a regional political party in Ceuta, Spain, founded in 1994.  The PDSC, which is primarily composed of Muslims, first gained a representative in the Asamblea in 1995.  Their representative, Mustafa Mizzian, became the first Muslim representative.

They later obtained three more seats.  In 2003, a series of internal divisions caused the PDSC to lose two seats, leaving only one which they later lost in the Autonomous Elections of 27 May.

References

Political parties in Ceuta
Political parties established in 1994
1994 establishments in Spain
Berbers in Spain